Heterosavia is a genus of the family of Phyllanthaceae first described as a genus in 2008. It is native to the Caribbean and southern Florida. It is found in Bahamas, Cayman Islands, Cuba, Dominican Republic, Florida, Haiti, Jamaica, southwest Caribbean and Turks-Caicos Islands.

The genus was circumscribed by Ignaz Urban and Petra Hoffmann in Brittonia vol.60 on page 152 in 2008.

The genus name of Heterosavia is in honour of Gaetano Savi (1769–1844), who was an Italian naturalist, botanist and mycologist.

Species
As accepted by PlantsofWorldOnline;
 Heterosavia bahamensis (Britton) Petra Hoffm. - Monroe County in Florida, Bahamas, Cuba, Jamaica, Cayman Islands, Turks & Caicos, islands of southwest Caribbean
 Heterosavia erythroxyloides (Griseb.) Petra Hoffm. - Cuba, Hispaniola
 Heterosavia laurifolia (Griseb.) Petra Hoffm. - Cuba
 Heterosavia maculata (Urb.) Petra Hoffm. - Cuba

References

Phyllanthaceae genera
Phyllanthaceae
Flora of Florida
Flora of the Caribbean